Steffi Graf was the defending champion and won in the final 6–4, 6–4 against Chris Evert.

Seeds
A champion seed is indicated in bold text while text in italics indicates the round in which that seed was eliminated.

  Steffi Graf (champion)
  Chris Evert (final)
  Gabriela Sabatini (fourth round)
  Hana Mandlíková (third round)
  Helena Suková (quarterfinals)
  Claudia Kohde-Kilsch (quarterfinals)
  Lori McNeil (first round)
  Zina Garrison (third round)
  Barbara Potter (quarterfinals)
  Katerina Maleeva (first round)
  Sandra Cecchini (first round)
  Raffaella Reggi (fourth round)
  Nathalie Tauziat (fourth round)
  Catarina Lindqvist (first round)
  Mary Joe Fernández (semifinals)
  Patty Fendick (first round)

Draw

Finals

Top half

Section 1

Section 2

Section 3

Section 4

Bottom half

Section 5

Section 6

Section 7

Section 8

References
 1988 Lipton International Players Championships Draw (Archived 2009-10-04)

1988 Lipton International Players Championships
Lipton International Players Championships - Women's Singles